Adolf Schulze (13 April 1835 – April 1920) was a German baritone and music educator.

Life 
Born in Panten, Schulze initially worked as an elementary school teacher in Hamburg. There, he also received his first vocal pedagogy training from Karl Voigt, which was later deepened in London with the singer and music teacher Manuel Garcia.

Since 1864, he was active as a concert and oratorio singer, again in Hamburg. In addition, Schulze gave singing lessons there. In the mid-1870s, he was appointed professor and conductor of the singing class at the Berlin University of the Arts. He was also a member of the senate of the Prussian Academy of Arts.

Schulze retired in autumn 1910, which he spent in Jena, where he died in April 1920 shortly before reaching the age of 85.

Further reading 
 Hugo Riemann: Riemann Musiklexikon. 10th edition, edited by Alfred Einstein; Max Hesse Verlag, Leipzig 1922, .
 Hermann Mendel and August Reissmann (ed.): Musikalisches Conversations-Lexikon:  Eine Encyklopädie der gesammten musikalischen Wissenschaften. Ninth volume, Robert Oppenheim, Berlin 1878,

References

External links 
 

German baritones
German music educators
1835 births
1920 deaths
People from Mölln, Schleswig-Holstein